Mark Anthony Neal is an American author and academic. He is the Professor of Black Popular Culture in the Department of African and African-American Studies at Duke University, where he won the 2010 Robert B. Cox Award for Teaching. Neal has written and lectured extensively on black popular culture, black masculinity, sexism and homophobia in Black communities, and the history of popular music.

Neal is the founder and managing editor of the blog NewBlackMan. He hosts the weekly webcast Left of Black in collaboration with the John Hope Franklin Center at Duke University. A frequent commentator for NPR, Neal contributes to several on-line media outlets, including Huff Post Black Voices and SeeingBlack.com.

Mark Anthony Neal is a member of Phi Beta Sigma fraternity.

Publications

What the Music Said: Black Popular Music and  Black Public Culture (1998) 

In this work, Neal interprets the vast array of issues and overlapping instances that create black music and culture. This book argues that there are two separate worlds in which this type of blackness exists. The first is black music as it exists alone. Here it confines itself to black people and the "formal and informal institutions of the Black Public Sphere." It sings in juke joints and travels around the Chitlin' Circuit separate from the (white) outside world. The other side of black culture Neal speaks of is the one that outsteps the Black Public Sphere and stretches into the mainstream. In the book he labels this as a "tumultuous marriage between black cultural production and mass consumerism-one in which black agency is largely subsumed by market interests." From this standpoint, Neal fleshes out the issues and ramifications of such a problematic "marriage."

Soul Babies: Black Popular Culture and the Post-Soul Aesthetic (2002) 

Using the term post-soul to "describe the political, social, and cultural experiences of the African-American community since the end of the civil rights movement and Black Power movement", Neal's Soul Babies explores the extent to which post-modernity can be applied to the African-American experience. Characterizing the black traditions of the civil rights era as modern, Neal argues that postmodern or post-soul expressions of blackness both borrow from black modern traditions and render these traditions dated and obsolete in the process of articulating their own identity. By illustrating both attributes that play into the new forms of blackness, Neal is capable of painting blackness to be more than one thing or another. Neal is able to play on familiar tropes that embody post soul blackness. Much of this articulation is based on what Neal calls "a sense of familiarity," or the exploitation of familiar tropes of blackness in post-soul expressions that are meant to heighten the sense of fracture and difference of the contemporary narratives built around them. OutKast's song "Rosa Parks" exemplifies the aesthetic as the duo "bastardized" black history and culture, to create an alternative meaning.

Neal also describes the contrast between the post-soul aesthetic and conventional black culture. Using Tupac Shakur and R. Kelly as examples of post-soul figures, Neal highlights the crass materialism as well as the complex black identities these artists represent as starkly different from older, more conventional black motifs. Furthermore, Neal explains the often confrontational nature by which post-soul figures are received by the more established and antiquated black community like the NAACP. Also central to the predominance of the post-soul aesthetic is its commodification of black culture into Rap albums and films.

Songs in the Keys of Black Life: A Rhythm and Blues Nation (2003) 

This book Neal's analysis of R&B as it functions in all facets of black life. In it he argues that Rhythm and Blues is more than a haphazard collection of love songs. Here he exhibits the genre as a type of catalogue for black life that expresses all of the joys, sacrifices, struggles, and contradictions involved in the history of black people. He discusses everything from Marvin Gaye, to Macy Gray to Black Entertainment Television; the later of which he charges with the promotion of hyper-sexualized, skewed views of black music. "Neal creates a dense, sensuous space for a critical cultured black perspective, what Soul Babies called the post-soul aesthetic in black America. He illustrates his thesis through the use of black vernacular forms to produce a voice that is both streetwise and scholarly ...Neal may be the first writer capable of developing groundbreaking ideas in the academy and getting a new sticker on his ghetto pass in one stroke."—The Washington Post

New Black Man: Rethinking Black Masculinity (2005) 

Neal identifies as a Feminist. His 2005 memoir New Black Man includes a letter to his feminist mentor, Masani Alexis DeVeaux. In the book he uses the term "NewBlackMan" to describe men who define their black manhood in gender-progressive terms. His thesis focuses on how the Strong Black Male narrative might be the most problematic issue facing the contemporary black man while the work itself chronicles his journey to becoming a black feminist male.

Looking for Leroy: (Il)Legible Black Masculinities (2013)

Here Neal analyzes the many ways in which black masculinity is constructed, reconstructed, read and misread in contemporary American culture. His thesis argues that black boy and men are bound by their legibility; their ability to be clearly stereotyped and placed into preset categories. This type of profiling divvies up black masculinity into something non-threatening enough for White America to accept and be at peace with. The illegible areas thus become unsettling. That which does not fit into say the thug or criminal category is incomprehensible and thus don't belong to black masculinity. Through looking at black male figures such as Jay Z, Luther Vandross and R. Kelly, Neal explores how varied representations of the black man are able to break the public antagonism against black male bodies.

Neal is also the co-editor (with Murray Forman) of That’s the Joint!: The Hip-Hop Studies Reader 2nd edition (2011)

See also
 Childish Gambino; This is America

References

External links
NewBlackMan (in Exile)
Department of African & African American Studies at Duke University
 Henry Jenkins, "Deciphering Black Masculinity: An Interview with Mark Anthony Neal (Part Three)", February 28, 2014.
Left of Black webcast
Neal on Huff Post Black Voices

American feminists
Duke University faculty
University at Buffalo alumni
Living people
American male writers
African-American academics
Year of birth missing (living people)
21st-century African-American people
African-American male writers
Male feminists